Pignari Bana is a commune in the Bandiagara Cercle in the Mopti Region of Mali. The commune contains 23 villages and in the 2009 census had a population of 28,258. The main village (chef-lieu) is Goundaka.

References

External links
.
.

Communes of Mopti Region